Neotibicen auriferus, commonly called Field cicada, is a species of annual cicada in the genus Neotibicen.

References

Hemiptera of North America
Insects described in 1825
Cryptotympanini